The Metropolitan School District of Warren Township is a school district on the east side of Marion County, Indianapolis, Indiana. In 2005 it had a student enrollment of 11,800, with the total population being 94,525.

It includes one high school, three intermediate/middle schools, nine elementary schools, one pre-school (The Early Childhood Center), and one alternative school for at-risk students of middle-school and high-school age (The Renaissance School).

The district has achieved an 86% graduation rate and over 74% progression to post-secondary education.

High school
 Warren Central High School (along with the Walker Career Center)

Middle schools
Stonybrook Intermediate/Middle School
Raymond Park Inermediate/Middle School
Creston Intermediate/Middle School

Elementary schools
Brookview Elementary School
Eastridge Elementary School
Grassy Creek Elementary School
Hawthorne Elementary School
Lakeside Elementary School
Liberty Park Elementary School
Lowell Elementary School
Pleasant Run Elementary School
Sunny Heights Elementary School

External links
 MSD of Warren Township Official Website

Warren Township
Education in Indianapolis